Hwangbo Je-gong of the Hwangju Hwangbo clan (황주 황보씨) was a nobleman in the Early Kingdom of Goryeo periods. He was the father of Queen Sinjeong and become the fourth father in-law of Taejo of Goryeo also the maternal grandfather of Daejong of Goryeo and Queen Daemok. He also held the position as Three Major Grand Masters (태위 삼중대광, 太尉 三重大匡) and become the founder of Hwangju Hwangbo clan.

In popular culture
Portrayed by Park Jung-woong in the 2002–2003 KBS TV series The Dawn of the Empire.
Portrayed by Woo Sang-jeon in the 2015 MBC TV series Shine or Go Crazy.

See also
Who also held the title as Samjung Daegwang:
Bak Yeong-gyu
Ryu Cheon-gung

References

Year of birth unknown
Year of death unknown
10th-century Korean people